The 2014–15 Rider Broncs men's basketball team represented Rider University during the 2014–15 NCAA Division I men's basketball season. The Broncs, led by third year head coach Kevin Baggett, played their home games at Alumni Gymnasium and were members of the Metro Atlantic Athletic Conference. The team's top performers were seniors Teddy Okereafor and Matt Lopez. Walk-on senior Emerson Bursis served as team captain. The Broncs finished the season 21–12, 15–5 in MAAC play to finish in second place. They lost in the quarterfinals of the MAAC tournament to Saint Peter's. They were invited to the College Basketball Invitational where they lost in the first round to Loyola–Chicago.

Roster

Schedule

|-
!colspan=9 style="background:#900B36; color:#FFFFFF;"| Exhibition

|-
!colspan=9 style="background:#900B36; color:#FFFFFF;"| Regular season

|-
!colspan=9 style="background:#900B36; color:#FFFFFF;"| MAAC tournament

|-
!colspan=9 style="background:#900B36; color:#FFFFFF;"| College Basketball Invitational

References

Rider Broncs men's basketball seasons
Rider
Rider
Rider Broncs
Rider Broncs